Warren County Courthouse is a historic county courthouse complex located at Front Royal, Warren County, Virginia. It was built in 1935–1936, and is a two-story, stone faced concrete block, Colonial Revival style building. It consists of a central rectangular block with a pedimented gable roof and smaller flanking recessed wings. The central block is topped by a three-stage cupola with an open and domed belfry. Also on the property are the contributing brick clerk's office (c. 1836), brick jail (c. 1950), and two war memorials - a Confederate Monument, dedicated in 1911, and an obelisk honoring veterans of World Wars I and II.

It was listed on the National Register of Historic Places in 2000. It is located in the Front Royal Historic District.

See also
 National Register of Historic Places listings in Warren County, Virginia

References

External links
 

County courthouses in Virginia
Courthouses on the National Register of Historic Places in Virginia
Colonial Revival architecture in Virginia
Government buildings completed in 1836
Buildings and structures in Warren County, Virginia
National Register of Historic Places in Warren County, Virginia
Individually listed contributing properties to historic districts on the National Register in Virginia
Front Royal, Virginia